Edward de Courcy Clarke (10 November 1880 – 30 November 1956), was a teacher, researcher and field geologist, winner of the Clarke Medal in 1954.

Biography 
Clarke was born in Waimate North, New Zealand, and studied at the University of Auckland, graduating in 1901.

After teaching and geological work in New Zealand, Clarke joined the Geological Survey of Western Australia, serving 1912–20. Clarke was then appointed Lecturer-in-charge of the Department of Geology in the University of Western Australia, and retired as Professor in 1948.

Clarke died in Kalgoorlie on 30 November 1956, and his ashes were scattered at Karrakatta Cemetery.

The Edward de Courcy Clarke Earth Science Museum was named in his honour in 1989.

References 

 Who was E. de C. Clarke? at Earth Museum, University of Western Australia

1880 births
1956 deaths
20th-century Australian geologists
New Zealand emigrants to Australia
University of Auckland alumni